Farm to Market Road 1462 (FM 1462) is a farm to market road located in Brazoria and Fort Bend counties, Texas.

Route description 
FM 1462 begins at  SH 36 at the community of Damon in Brazoria County. The road follows a northeasterly path, entering Fort Bend County and turning to the east. It has a junction with  FM 762, which provides access to Brazos Bend State Park and the George Observatory via  PR 72. FM 1462 crosses over the Brazos River and returns to Brazoria County. Seven miles east of the bridge is Rosharon and the intersection of  FM 521. The route then has an interchange with the  SH 288 freeway. The route travels past several newer neighborhoods and subdivisions before entering Alvin and ending at an intersection with  SH 35 (future SH 99) near Alvin Community College.

History
FM 1462 was originally designated in Brazoria County on July 14, 1949, connecting SH 288 near Rosharon to SH 35 in Alvin. The route was extended to the Brazos River crossing at the county line on September 27, 1960, and then through Fort Bend County and to SH 36 at Damon on October 10, 1961. The extension to Damon usurped the short-lived FM 2715 and the western portion of FM 762.

Major intersections

References

Transportation in Brazoria County, Texas
Transportation in Fort Bend County, Texas
1462